The 2013 North Queensland Cowboys season was the 19th in the club's history. Coached by Neil Henry and co-captained by Johnathan Thurston and Matthew Scott, they competed in the NRL's 2013 Telstra Premiership. The Cowboys finished the season in 8th place and were knocked out in the first week of the finals by the Cronulla Sharks.

Season summary
The Cowboys entered the 2013 NRL season with high expectations and without their long time hooker and club legend Aaron Payne, who retired at the end of 2012. The side won their Round 1 game against the Canterbury Bulldogs but would only win five of their next 19 games, leaving them sitting in 15th place after 20 rounds. Tragedy struck the club on 29 April, when talented rookie Alex Elisala died at age 20. The Cowboys defeated the Parramatta Eels five days later, dedicating the game and the rest of the season to Elisala.

On 29 July, coach Neil Henry had his contract terminated after re-signing until the end of 2014 in March. Henry stayed on as head coach until the end of 2013, as the Cowboys went on a six-game winning streak to  finish in 8th place and qualify for the finals series. They were defeated 20-18 by the Cronulla Sharks in week 1 of the finals, in a game in which the Sharks scored a try on the 7th tackle of a set.

On 1 October the club appointed former player Paul Green as their head coach for the 2014 and 2015 seasons.

At the end of the season, the Cowboys' had 13 players selected for the 2013 Rugby League World Cup.

Milestones
 Round 1: Ashton Sims played his 50th game for the club.
 Round 1: Rory Kostjasyn and Scott Moore made their debuts for the club.
 Round 2: Ray Thompson played his 50th game for the club.
 Round 3: Ashley Graham played his 150th game for the club.
 Round 3: Johnathan Thurston played his 200th NRL game.
 Round 4: Glenn Hall played his 50th game for the club.
 Round 6: Clint Greenshields made his debut for the club.
 Round 7: Brent Tate played his 200th NRL game.
 Round 9: Matthew Scott played his 150th game for the club.
 Round 10: Glenn Hall played his 150th NRL game.
 Round 12: Ethan Lowe made his NRL debut.
 Round 17: Antonio Winterstein played his 50th game for the club.
 Round 17: Scott Bolton played his 100th game for the club.
 Round 21: Kyle Feldt made his NRL debut.
 Round 21: Ashton Sims played his 200th NRL game.
 Round 22: Brent Tate played his 50th game for the club.
 Round 24: Wayne Ulugia made his NRL debut.
 Round 25: Jayden Hodges made his NRL debut.
 Finals Week 1: Tariq Sims played his 50th game for the club.
 Finals Week 1: James Tamou played his 100th NRL game.

Squad List

Squad Movement

2013 Gains

2013 Losses

Ladder

Fixtures

Pre-season

Regular season

Finals

Statistics

Source:

Representatives
The following players have played a representative match in 2013

Honours

League
Dally M Five-Eighth of the Year: Johnathan Thurston

Club
Paul Bowman Medal: Matthew Scott
Player's Player: Matthew Scott
Club Person of the Year: Kevin Marty
Rookie of the Year: Kyle Feldt
Most Improved: Joel Riethmuller
NYC Player of the Year: Jayden Hodges

Feeder Clubs

National Youth Competition
 North Queensland Cowboys - 10th, missed finals

Queensland Cup
 Mackay Cutters - 2nd, won Grand Final
 Northern Pride - 1st, lost Preliminary Final

References

North Queensland Cowboys seasons
North Queensland Cowboys season